The Valley City Barnes County Public Library, also known as Valley City Public Library or the Valley City Carnegie Library, in Valley City, North Dakota, United States, is a Carnegie library that was built in 1903.  It was listed on the National Register of Historic Places in 1979.

It was deemed significant as one of three libraries designed by Fargo architect William C. Albrant and one of only three relatively unaltered Carnegie libraries surviving in North Dakota.

References

External links

Library buildings completed in 1903
Libraries on the National Register of Historic Places in North Dakota
Neoclassical architecture in North Dakota
Carnegie libraries in North Dakota
National Register of Historic Places in Barnes County, North Dakota
1903 establishments in North Dakota
Jeffersonian Revival architecture